Hysteria is the fourth studio album by English synth-pop band the Human League, released on 7 May 1984 by Virgin Records. Following the worldwide success of their previous studio album Dare (1981), the band struggled to make a successful follow-up and the sessions for Hysteria were fraught with problems. The album title itself is taken from the problematic recording period. Producers Martin Rushent and Chris Thomas both left the project which would eventually be finished by producer Hugh Padgham.

Hysteria attained relatively lacklustre success in comparison to its multi-platinum predecessor. Three singles from the album reached the top 20 of the UK Singles Chart, and "The Lebanon" was the only single to chart in the United States, peaking at number 64 on the Billboard Hot 100. The album peaked at number three on the UK Albums Chart and has been certified Gold by the British Phonographic Industry (BPI), denoting shipments in excess of 100,000 copies.

In 2005, Hysteria was remastered and reissued with B-sides and extended mixes as bonus tracks.

The song "Rock Me Again and Again and Again and Again and Again and Again" is a cover of a 1973 song by Lyn Collins and James Brown. "I Love You Too Much" is a substantially remixed version from the EP Fascination! (1983) and "Don't You Know I Want You" is a reworked version of the instrumental B-side "Total Panic!" that appeared on the "(Keep Feeling) Fascination" single in 1983.

Track listing
Side one
 "I'm Coming Back" (Oakey, Wright) – 4:07
 "I Love You Too Much" (Burden, Callis, Wright) – 3:26
 "Rock Me Again and Again and Again and Again and Again and Again (Six Times)" (Austin, Brown) – 3:32
 "Louise" (Callis, Oakey, Wright) – 4:55
 "The Lebanon" (Callis, Oakey) – 5:03

Side two
 "Betrayed" (Oakey, Wright) – 4:02
 "The Sign" (Burden, Callis, Oakey) – 3:46
 "So Hurt" (Burden, Oakey) – 3:53
 "Life on Your Own" (Callis, Oakey, Wright) – 4:06
 "Don't You Know I Want You" (Burden, Callis, Oakey) – 3:09

2005 CD bonus tracks
 "Thirteen" (from "The Lebanon" 12-inch single, and 7" B-side)
 "The World Tonight" (from "Life on Your Own" 12-inch single, and 7" B-side)
 "The Lebanon" (extended version)
 "Life on Your Own" (extended version)
 "The Sign" (extended version)

Personnel
Credits adapted from the liner notes of Hysteria.

Musicians

 Ian C. Burden – bass, keyboards, guitar
 Jo Callis – guitar, keyboards, vocals
 Joanne Catherall – vocals
 Philip Oakey – vocals, programming, keyboards
 Susanne Sulley – vocals
 Philip Adrian Wright – occasional keyboards
 The Human League – percussion, programming
 Martin Rushent – drum programming 
 Jim Russell – drum programming 

Technical

 Hugh Padgham – mixing, production, engineering
 Chris Thomas – production
 The Human League – production
 Bill Price – engineering
 Renate Blauel – engineering
 Gavin MacKillop – engineering
 Steve Jackson – engineering assistance
 David Motion – engineering assistance
 Jeremy Allom – engineering assistance
 Paul "Croydon" Cook – engineering assistance

Artwork
 Simon Fowler – photography
 Ken Ansell – layout

Charts

Weekly charts

Year-end charts

Certifications

Gallery

References

External links
 

1984 albums
Albums produced by Chris Thomas (record producer)
Albums produced by Hugh Padgham
The Human League albums
Virgin Records albums